Brithdir railway station is a railway station serving the village of Brithdir near New Tredegar, South Wales. Work to extend the platform for six-car trains is in progress.

Services
Mondays to Saturdays there is an hourly service southbound to Cardiff Central and Penarth and to  northbound (with peak period extras).

References

External links

Railway stations in Caerphilly County Borough
DfT Category F2 stations
Former Rhymney Railway stations
Railway stations in Great Britain opened in 1871
Railway stations served by Transport for Wales Rail